Interstate 279 (I-279), locally referred to as Parkway North, is a north–south auxiliary Interstate Highway that lies entirely within Allegheny County, Pennsylvania. Its southern end is at I-376 at the Fort Pitt Bridge in Pittsburgh, and the north end is in Franklin Park at I-79. It primarily serves at the main access route between Pittsburgh and its northern suburbs.

Route description 

The southern terminus of I-279 is at I-376 in Downtown Pittsburgh. It runs concurrently with US Route 19 Truck (US 19 Truck) from its southern terminus to exit 4. (US 19 Truck continues on I-376 west.) I-279 crosses the Fort Duquesne Bridge over the Allegheny River, providing easy access to Heinz Field and PNC Park. I-579 intersects I-279 but is only accessible by southbound traffic; likewise, traffic from I-579 can only head northbound on I-279 by the I-279 Interchange. I-279 features two reversible high-occupancy vehicle lanes (HOV lanes). The HOV lanes end at exit 5, which is an interchange with US 19. The road becomes more suburban and rural as it continues to head north. It has two additional interchanges, Bellevue/West View and Camp Horne Road. After Camp Horne Road, there are no exits until its terminus  later. The Interstate terminates at its parent, I-79. Like the interchange with I-579, this is also a partial interchange. Traffic on I-279 is only permitted to exit northbound on I-79, while only traffic heading southbound on I-79 can exit on to I-279 south.

The section from exit 1B to exit 2B is also known as the North Shore Expressway.

History 

I-279 was first proposed in 1958 to run along what is now I-79 between the current I-376 in Carnegie and the current I-279 in Franklin Park. On October 2, 1972, its route was swapped with I-79, putting I-279 onto its current route, although only the downtown portion and the Fort Duquesne Bridge were built at the time.

In 1973, the designation was extended from downtown over Parkway West (what is now I-376) to I-79. This section became part of I-376 in 2009, and the I-279 signs were taken down there.

I-279 from Fort Duquesne Bridge to its current northern terminus in Franklin Park was approved on June 4, 1975, but constructed from 1985 to 1989, opening in its entirety with a Governor Bob Casey Sr. ribbon-cutting on September 16, 1989. From 1997 to 2003, various ramps, the Fort Pitt Bridge, and nearby tunnels were reconstructed. A direct connection from I-279 south to I-376 east was opened in 2002.

A tragedy occurred on the reversible HOV lanes in 1995 when a negligent highway worker failed to close the outbound gates, leading to a head-on collision that killed six. In 2006, to help prevent a repeat of this incident, automatic "fast acting gates" were activated at the southern entrances to these HOV lanes in Downtown Pittsburgh.

Unearthed cemetery 
During the last phases of construction of I-279 in 1987, a long-forgotten cemetery dating from the 19th century was unearthed near the site of the current I-279/I-579 split. Archeologists spent four months exhuming the graves for cultural studies at the Smithsonian Institution, putting the Pennsylvania Department of Transportation (PennDOT) significantly behind schedule. It was determined that the graves belonged to Swiss and German immigrants that were members of a local church located next door to the cemetery in what was then Allegheny City, with 727 graves buried at the  site between 1833 and 1861. The graves were forgotten about by 1911 when the church did an addition to the building and had the foundation unintentionally go through about 15 graves, with the churchyard housing the cemetery later becoming a parking lot in 1950. Aside from a pair of stillborn twins, none of the graves were identified, and archeologists were unable to find any living descendants due to the obscurity of the cemetery. The remains were reburied with one marker at the church's current cemetery in the Troy Hill section of Pittsburgh in 2003 after the Smithsonian Institution finished studying them; the congregation itself disbanded in 1984 after PennDOT bought the church property via eminent domain for I-279 and only had 21 members at that point. Today, it is the largest number of 19th century graves (Native American graves notwithstanding) ever studied archeologically in the US.

Exit list

See also

References

External links 

 I-279 on Kurumi.com
 Interstate Guide - I-279
 Pennsylvania Highways: I-279
 I-279 at AARoads.com
 Pennsylvania Roads - I-279

Auxiliary Interstate Highways
Interstate Highways in Pennsylvania
2
Interstate 279
Interstate 279
Roads with a reversible lane